Stenoponia is a genus of fleas belonging to the family Hystrichopsyllidae.

The species of this genus are found in Europe and Northern America.

Species:
 Stenoponia americana (Baker, 1899)
 Stenoponia coelestis Jordan & Rothschild, 1911

References

Hystrichopsyllidae
Siphonaptera genera